Patriarch Gregory or Catholicos Gregory may refer to:

 Constantinople
 Gregory of Nazianzus, Patriarch in 379–381
 Gregory II of Constantinople, Patriarch in 1283–1289
 Gregory III of Constantinople, Patriarch in 1443–1450
 Gregory IV of Constantinople, Patriarch in 1623
 Gregory V of Constantinople, Patriarch in 1797–1798, 1806–1808 and 1818–1821
 Gregory VI of Constantinople, Patriarch in 1835–1840
 Gregory VII of Constantinople, Patriarch in 1923–1924 

 Alexandria
 Patriarch Gregory of Cappadocia, Patriarch in 339-345
 Patriarch Gregory I of Alexandria, Patriarch in 1243–1263
 Patriarch Gregory II of Alexandria, Patriarch in 1316–1354
 Patriarch Gregory III of Alexandria, Patriarch in 1354–1366
 Patriarch Gregory IV of Alexandria, Patriarch in 1398–1412
 Patriarch Gregory V of Alexandria, Patriarch in 1484–1486

 Bulgaria
 Gregory of Bulgaria, Patriarch c. 940 – c. 960

 Armenian Apostolic Church
 Gregory the Illuminator (c. 257 – c. 331), patron saint and first official head of the Armenian Apostolic Church
 Grigoris (catholicos), 4th-century catholicos of Caucasian Albania and martyr
 Gregory II the Martyrophile (1066–1105)
 Grigor III Pahlavuni (1093–1166), Catholicos Gregory III of Cilicia (1113–1166)
  (1173–1193)
 Gregory V of Cilicia (1193–1194)
 Gregory VI of Cilicia (1194–1203)
 Gregory VII of Cilicia (1293–1307)
  (1411–1418)
 Gregory IX of Cilicia (1439–1446)
 Gregory X of Armenia (1443–1465)
 Gregory XI of Armenia (1536–1545)
 Gregory XII of Armenia (1576–1590)

 Armenian Catholic Patriarchs of Cilicia
  (1788–1812)
  (1815–1841)
  (1844–1866)
 Gregorio Pietro XV Agagianian (1895-1971), Armenian Catholic Patriarch of Cilicia in 1937-1962
 Gregory Peter XX Ghabroyan (1934–2021), Armenian Catholic Patriarch of Cilicia since 2015

See also 
 Gregory IV of Athens, Metropolitan of Athens in 1827–1828
 Pope Gregory (disambiguation)
 Saint Gregory (disambiguation)
 Gregory (disambiguation)
 Gregory (given name)